Tarmoola or Tarmoola Station is a pastoral lease that operates as a cattle station located about  north west of Leonora and  south of Leinster in the Goldfields–Esperance region of Western Australia. The western boundary of Tarmoola adjoins Sturt Meadows Station.

The property was established on land that was previously owned by the Leonora Pastoral Company but had remained largely undeveloped. Together with W. G. Hawkes, McBride formed the Tarmoola Pastoral Company in 1924 and embarked on an improvement program.

The area had just come out of drought conditions and was being stocked with sheep. A consignment of 3,300, worth £10,000 was delivered from South Australia.

The area suffered a four-year drought that ended in 1947 with Tarmoola recording  of rain in a single day.

In 1950 the property was acquired by J. G. Money, who also owned Weebo and Willara stations along with large dairy properties. McBride remained on Tarmoola as manager but retired and left the area later the same year.

In 2014 the owner of the property was the Saint Barbara mining company. The property was destocked in 2014 and was suffering from an infestation of coral cactus.

See also
List of ranches and stations

References

Pastoral leases in Western Australia
Goldfields-Esperance
Stations (Australian agriculture)